Harvey is a city in Marion County, Iowa, United States.   At the time of the 2020 census, its population was 236.

Geography 
Harvey is located at  (41.315559, -92.925672).

Demographics

2010 census
As of the census of 2010, there were 235 people, 109 households, and 63 families residing in the city. The racial makeup of the city was 97.4% White, 0.4% Native American, 1.3% Asian, and 0.9% from other races. Hispanic or Latino of any race were 0.9% of the population.

There were 109 households, of which 22.0% had children under the age of 18 living with them, 45.0% were married couples living together, 9.2% had a female householder with no husband present, 3.7% had a male householder with no wife present, and 42.2% were non-families. 36.7% of all households were made up of individuals, and 16.5% had someone living alone who was 65 years of age or older. The average household size was 2.16 and the average family size was 2.79.

The median age in the city was 44.9 years. 18.3% of residents were under the age of 18; 7.3% were between the ages of 18 and 24; 24.6% were from 25 to 44; 31.1% were from 45 to 64; and 18.7% were 65 years of age or older. The gender makeup of the city was 50.2% male and 49.8% female.

2000 census
As of the census of 2000, there were 277 people, 111 households, and 79 families residing in the city. The racial makeup of the city was 99.64% White and 0.36% African American.

There were 111 households, out of which 33.3% had children under the age of 18 living with them, 58.6% were married couples living together, 10.8% had a female householder with no husband present, and 28.8% were non-families. 22.5% of all households were made up of individuals, and 7.2% had someone living alone who was 65 years of age or older.  The average household size was 2.50 and the average family size was 2.92.

In the city, the population was spread out, with 23.8% under the age of 18, 11.6% from 18 to 24, 31.4% from 25 to 44, 21.7% from 45 to 64, and 11.6% who were 65 years of age or older.  The median age was 35 years.  For every 100 females, there were 102.2 males.  For every 100 females age 18 and over, there were 108.9 males.

The median income for a household in the city was $34,688, and the median income for a family was $35,536. Males had a median income of $32,000 versus $25,000 for females. The per capita income for the city was $12,770.  19.2% of the population and 18.7% of families were below the poverty line, including 14.5% of those under the age of 18 and 21.4% of those 65 and older.

Education
The Knoxville Community School District operates local public schools.

References

Cities in Iowa
Cities in Marion County, Iowa